Paul Graham Albert Way (born 12 March 1963) is an English professional golfer.

Way was born in Kingsbury, Middlesex. He went to the Hugh Christie School in Tonbridge, Kent. He won the Brabazon Trophy in 1981.

Way turned professional in 1982 and quickly found success on the European Tour, winning that year's KLM Dutch Open.

For a few years, Way was one of Europe's most promising young golfers, and he represented Europe in the Ryder Cup in 1983, when he became the second youngest Ryder Cup player up to that time after Nick Faldo, and again in 1985, when Europe captured the trophy which had been in American hands for twenty-eight years. He had an outstanding Ryder Cup record of six wins, two losses and one halved match.

Way did not sustain his early success. His last top 100 finish on the Order of Merit was in 1993 and after 1997 he played little tournament golf. He began playing on the European Senior Tour after turning 50 in March 2013.

Amateur wins
1981 Brabazon Trophy

Professional wins (4)

European Tour wins (3)

European Tour playoff record (1–1)

Sunshine Tour wins (1)

Results in major championships

Note: Way never played in the Masters Tournament nor the U.S. Open.

CUT = missed the half-way cut (3rd round cut in 1983 and 1985 Open Championships)
"T" = tied

Team appearances
Amateur
Jacques Léglise Trophy (representing Great Britain & Ireland): 1980 (winners)
European Amateur Team Championship (representing England): 1981 (winners)
Walker Cup (representing Great Britain & Ireland): 1981

Professional
Ryder Cup (representing Europe): 1983, 1985
Dunhill Cup (representing England): 1985
World Cup (representing England): 1985

External links

English male golfers
European Tour golfers
European Senior Tour golfers
Ryder Cup competitors for Europe
People from Kingsbury, London
People from Tonbridge
1963 births
Living people